Semiplotus modestus is a species of cyprinid in the genus Semiplotus that inhabits India and upper Myanmar. It is classified as "data deficient" on the IUCN Red List.

References

Cyprinid fish of Asia
IUCN Red List data deficient species
Freshwater fish of India
Fish of Myanmar